Kate Moyer (born ) is a Canadian actress.

Career 
In 2018, Moyer portrayed Heather Hobbie, the younger sister of Holly Hobbie in season 1 of the series Holly Hobbie, which aired on Hulu in the United States and subsequently on the Family Channel in Canada and again in season two in 2019. In 2021, Moyer reprised the role of Heather Hobbie as season 3 of Holly Hobbie was released. Moyer also appeared as Olivia in the Hallmark TV movie A Christmas in Tennessee. In 2019, Moyer appeared as Young Peggy in the film Buffaloed, as the young version of the lead character portrayed by Zoey Deutch and appearing opposite to Judy Greer. Moyer was also a guest star on the season three finale of Hulu's The Handmaid's Tale in the role of Kiki/Rebecca appearing alongside of Elizabeth Moss. Also in 2019, she was cast as Sofia, a young orphan, in season one of the Hallmark television series When Hope Calls. In 2020, she was cast as Eden Edwards in Children of the Corn. The completed film was given a limited release to a test audience in October 2020, however it is anticipated the completed film with be fully released sometime in 2023.

In December 2021, Moyer appears in the HBO Max limited series release of Station Eleven as Haley Butterscotch. In 2022, she was cast as Rose in a film, Delia's Gone.

Filmography

Film

Television

Awards and nominations 
In 2019, she received a Canadian Screen Award nomination for Best Supporting Actress at the 7th Canadian Screen Awards for her performance in the film Our House. In 2020, Moyer was again nominated for a Canadian Screen Award in the TV category, Best Performance in a Children's or Youth Program or Series for her portrayal of Heather Hobbie in season 1 of Holly Hobbie.

References

External links
 
 

2000s births
Canadian television actresses
Canadian film actresses
Actresses from Oshawa
Living people
Canadian child actresses
Year of birth missing (living people)